Kumbakonam P. Rajagopalan (January,1902–27.4.1944), known by his pen name Ku. Pa. Ra. was a Tamil writer, translator  and journalist. He is linked with the Manikodi tradition of Tamil writers. He has been compared with his co-writers Pudumaipithan, Mowni. M. V. Venkatram and Na. Pichamurthy. His short stories are clear and bold. His subject deals more of the hidden feelings of women on love and sex.

His sister, Ku.Pa.Sethu, was also a writer.

Early life 
Rajagopalan was born in 1902 in Kumbakonam, Madras Presidency. He had his education in Kumbakonam and joined the services of the Madras government. However, he was soon affected by cataract and was forced to quit his government job.

Career 
In 1937, when sight was restored to his eyes after a successful operation, he moved to Madras in order to commence a career as a professional writer. For a time, he worked for a daily called Tamil Nadu along with C. S. Chellappa.

Legacy 
Senthooram Jagadish produced a documentary film concerning Rajagopalan which was aired on Kalaignar TV Seithigal channel in 2009.

References 

 

1902 births
1944 deaths
Tamil writers
Journalists from Tamil Nadu
People from Thanjavur district
20th-century Indian journalists